Réquiem por Granada is a period drama television miniseries directed by Vicente Escrivá recreating the fall of the Kingdom of Granada in the 15th century. An international co-production, it aired on TVE1 in 1991.

Premise 
The fiction retells from the Muslim perspective the fall of the Nasrid Kingdom of Granada.

Cast 
 Horst Buchholz as Muley Hassan
 Delia Boccardo as Fátima
 Manuel Bandera as Boabdil
  as Isabel de Solís
  as Ismail
  as Isabella the Catholic
  as Ferdinand the Catholic
 Oleg Fedorov as Al Zagal
 Juanjo Puigcorbé as Christopher Columbus
 Esperanza Campuzano as Moraima
 Germán Cobos
 Julio Gavilanes
 Javier Loyola

Production and release 
Featuring a budget of 1,500 million pesetas, Réquiem por Granada was a co-production of Aspa Films, Midega Films, TVE, RAI 1 and Taurus Film. The series was directed by Vicente Escrivá, whereas the score was composed by Antón García Abril. Filming, which began on 12 February 1990 in Sierra Nevada, was beset by problems. Shooting locations included the Alhambra, the Great Mosque of Córdoba, and the Alcázar of Seville, as well as Fez, in Morocco. The miniseries consisted of 8 episodes featuring a running time of 52 minutes. The broadcasting run on TVE1 began on 9 October 1991. The finale was programmed for 27 November 1991.

References 

La 1 (Spanish TV channel) network series
Television series set in the 15th century
1990s Spanish drama television series
1991 Spanish television series debuts
1991 Spanish television series endings
Cultural depictions of Christopher Columbus
Cultural depictions of Isabella I of Castile
Television shows filmed in Spain
Television shows filmed in Morocco